The 2022 season was the New Orleans Saints' 56th in the National Football League (NFL), their 47th playing home games at the Caesars Superdome and their first under head coach Dennis Allen.

Long-time head coach Sean Payton announced his retirement shortly after the Saints 2021 season ended on January 25, 2022. In his 16 years as head coach, Payton led the Saints to seven NFC South titles, nine playoff appearances, and to the franchise's first and only Super Bowl title in Super Bowl XLIV. Prior to his departure, Payton was also the second-longest active tenured head coach in the NFL, only behind Bill Belichick of the New England Patriots. On February 8, 2022, Allen was announced as the next head coach.

The Saints failed to improve from their 9–8 season from last year after a loss to the San Francisco 49ers in Week 12, and after another loss to the Tampa Bay Buccaneers the next week, the Saints clinched their first losing season since 2016. Although the Saints beat the Philadelphia Eagles in Week 17, they were eliminated from playoff contention for the second consecutive season after wins by the Tampa Bay Buccaneers, Detroit Lions, and Green Bay Packers the same week. It was the first time the Saints missed the playoffs in consecutive seasons since missing the playoffs between 2014-2016.

Draft

Draft trades

Staff

Final roster

Preseason
The Saints' preseason opponents and schedule was announced in the spring.

Regular season

Schedule
On May 4, the NFL announced that the Saints played the Minnesota Vikings during Week 4 on October 2 at Tottenham Hotspur Stadium in London, as part of the league's International Series. The game kickoff at 2:30 p.m. BST/8:30 a.m. CDT, and was televised by the NFL Network, with the Saints serving as the home team.

The remainder of the Saints' 2022 schedule, with exact dates and times, were announced on May 12.

Note: Intra-division opponents are in bold text.

Game summaries

Week 1: at Atlanta Falcons

Although the Saints trailed by 16 points early in the fourth quarter, Jameis Winston led the team to 17 unanswered points, culminating in a 51-yard game-winning field goal from Wil Lutz. The Falcons had the chance to retake the lead in the last second, but Payton Turner blocked their field goal attempt to seal the win and start off the Saints' season at 1–0.

Week 2: vs. Tampa Bay Buccaneers

In the fourth quarter, Marshon Lattimore and Mike Evans got into a fight at midfield, resulting in both players being ejected. The Saints lost to Tampa Bay for the first time since the 2018 season, it is also the first time since the 2017 season that they lost to a side quarterbacked by Tom Brady.

Week 3: at Carolina Panthers

Even though the Saints scored 14 points in the 4th quarter, they still lost to the Panthers in Week 3 for the first time since the 2015 season.

Week 4: vs. Minnesota Vikings
NFL London games

Hoping to grab a second win, the Saints flew to London to host the Minnesota Vikings. This was the first time the Saints had played in the United Kingdom since the 2017 season and their first International Series game as the home team since 2008. After trailing for most of the game, the Saints took the lead in the fourth quarter through a Taysom Hill touchdown run. Justin Jefferson put the Vikings back in front five minutes later, only for Greg Joseph to miss the extra point, allowing Wil Lutz to tie the game with a career-long 60-yard field goal. Joseph put the Vikings back in front again with a 47-yard kick after a long reception by Jefferson with less than 30 seconds to play, only for a Chris Olave catch to put the Saints in range of another game-tying field goal from 61 yards; however, Lutz's kick bounced back off the left upright and the crossbar to give the Vikings a 28–25 win. It was the Saints' first loss to the Vikings since 2017, giving them their worst start to a season since 2016.

Week 5: vs. Seattle Seahawks
After their close loss to the Vikings, the Saints flew back home to the Superdome for their Week 5 matchup against the Seattle Seahawks. Andy Dalton started his second game at quarterback, but it was utility player Taysom Hill that stole the show in the Superdome that afternoon, who helped guide New Orleans to victory over the fiesty Seahawks 39–32 thanks to a phenomenal 3-touchdown performance from him, the last of which being a 60-yard run that put the Saints ahead for good. With the thrilling win, the Saints improved to 2–3.

Week 6: vs. Cincinnati Bengals

Andy Dalton would start his third straight game, this time facing off against his former team. Though the Saints found themselves holding a two-score lead twice during the game, the Bengals pulled out a late fourth quarter comeback victory on a 60-yard touchdown pass from Joe Burrow to Ja'Marr Chase. On a botched 4th down conversion play, Eli Apple made a hit on Marquez Callaway which was controversially not flagged. The Saints were defeated 26–30, and fell to 2–4 on the year.

Week 7: at Arizona Cardinals
Andy Dalton started for the fourth straight game for the Saints on Thursday Night Football against the Cardinals. Although he would pass for four touchdowns, he threw three costly interceptions, two of which were returned for touchdowns in a span of about a minute near the end of the first half. The Cardinals found themselves up 28–14 because of these key defensive plays despite trailing New Orleans 14–6 at the start of the second quarter. The Cardinals would continue their dominance throughout the third quarter, holding the Saints to a field goal while scoring a touchdown of their own to go up 35–17, their largest lead of the night. In the fourth quarter, despite a late Saints rally in which they outscored Arizona 17–7 to cut the lead to just 8, the Cardinals held on for a thrilling 42–34 victory. The loss marked the first time since the 2015 season that the Saints were beaten by the Cardinals.

With the defeat, New Orleans fell to 2–5.

Week 8: vs. Las Vegas Raiders

Andy Dalton started his fifth straight game of the season with Jameis Winston still out with an injury. Against the Raiders, the Saints thoroughly dominated them in front of a raucous capacity crowd of Saints fans in the Superdome, shutting them out 24–0. Dalton recorded a pair of passing touchdowns, both of which went to Alvin Kamara, who also logged a rushing touchdown to cap off a brilliant day for the star running back. The Saints defense smothered a Raiders offense that had put up a season-high 38 points the previous week, only allowing them to cross midfield once late in the game.

With the dominant win, the Saints improved to 3–5. They also defeated the Raiders for the first time since the 2012 season.

Week 9: vs. Baltimore Ravens
Following their win against the Raiders, the Saints stayed home to face off against the Baltimore Ravens in a Week 9 contest on Monday Night Football. For the sixth straight game, Andy Dalton was named the starting quarterback for the team. The Saints found themselves in a big 14–0 deficit early on in the first half, courtesy of a Lamar Jackson passing touchdown and a Kenyan Drake rushing touchdown. The Saints would get their first points off the night off a Wil Lutz field goal to cut the deficit to 11 as time expired in the first half. In the third quarter, Justin Tucker would kick his first field goal of the night to make the score 17–3, but the Saints answered right back with a second Lutz field goal to make the score 17–6. In the fourth quarter however, the Ravens would put the game away as Tucker nailed his second field goal of the game, followed by another Kenyan Drake touchdown to make it a 21-point deficit for the Saints. A late touchdown pass from Dalton to Juwan Johnson made the final score 27–13, Ravens.

With the defeat, the Saints fell to 3–6.

Week 10: at Pittsburgh Steelers

After a tough loss to the Baltimore Ravens, they travel to Acrisure Stadium to take on the Pittsburgh Steelers. With the loss, the Saints drop to 3–7 on the year and it was the first time since 2006 that they were defeated by the Steelers.

Week 11: vs. Los Angeles Rams

They return to the Superdome to take on the Los Angeles Rams. It has been four years since New Orleans played them at home, including the aforementioned NFC Championship. With the win over the Rams, the Saints improve to 4–7 on the year. It was the first time since the 2018 season in which New Orleans defeated the Los Angeles Rams.

Week 12: at San Francisco 49ers

They meet with the San Francisco 49ers on the road. After Kamara fumbled twice, the Saints struggled to hold off Jimmy Garoppolo and his offense. They didn't even score points, thus snapping their streak without being shut out. This loss brought the Saints record down to 4–8.

Week 13: at Tampa Bay Buccaneers

The Saints traveled to Tampa for their second matchup against their division rival, the Buccaneers. They were unable to hold on as they were swept by the Buccaneers for the first time since the 2007 season. With the loss, the Saints fell to 4–9, securing the franchise its first losing season since 2016.

Week 15: vs. Atlanta Falcons

The Saints host the Falcons in the Superdome. In Week 1, they defeated them with a 51-yard field goal and a kick block. With the victory, not only did the Saints sweep Atlanta, but they also improve to their 5–9 record.

Week 16: at Cleveland Browns
The Saints travel to FirstEnergy Stadium to take on the Cleveland Browns in a cold weather game. They trailed in the first half but came back in the second half. With the 17–10 victory, they improve to 6–9.

Week 17: at Philadelphia Eagles
The Saints meet the Eagles for the third straight season. After losing to them in both the 2020 and 2021 seasons, they improved their performance with Andy Dalton and Taysom Hill. In the first half, the Saints scored a touchdown and three field goals to give them the lead. Although they gave up only one touchdown, Minshew threw a pick six to Marshon Lattimore. For the first time since the 2018 season, the Saints beat the Eagles. It was an easy win for the Saints as Jalen Hurts was sidelined due to his shoulder injury. They improve to 7–9, but only to be eliminated from postseason contention.

Week 18: vs. Carolina Panthers

After a win over the Philadelphia Eagles, the Saints return home for their last regular season game against the Panthers. In Saints' territory, Marcus Davenport and D'Onta Foreman both got into a fight, resulting in ejections. After Eddy Pineiro nailed a 42-yard field goal, the Saints get swept by the Panthers for the first time since the 2015 season, finishing their season with a 7-10 record, earning them the worst season since 2005.

Standings

Division

Conference

References

External links
 

New Orleans
New Orleans Saints seasons
New Orleans Saints